HMS Talent was the sixth of seven  nuclear submarines of the Royal Navy, and was built at Barrow-in-Furness. Talent was launched by The Princess Royal in April 1988 and commissioned in May 1990. The boat is affiliated with Shrewsbury in Shropshire. Talent is the third submarine of the Royal Navy to bear the name.

Talent moved her base from Devonport to Her Majesty's Naval Base Clyde in July 2019.

In April 2022, it was reported that Talent was being prepared for disposal with formal decommissioning scheduled for May. She decommissioned in May 2022.

Operational history
Talent undertook a refit at her base port in HMNB Devonport and in March 2007 rejoined the active fleet, following a £386 million upgrade. She has been given a new reactor core and has been equipped with a new sonar suite, Sonar 2076. Sonar 2076 has the power equivalent to approximately 400 PCs and can precisely track the movement of small objects from hundreds of miles away. The Royal Navy describe Sonar 2076 as the most advanced sonar in service with any navy in the world. She has also been given the ability to fire Tomahawk cruise missiles.

On 6 August 2013, she returned to Plymouth after a 3-month deployment.

In 2009, she suffered loss of primary and alternative power supplies to her nuclear reactors.

She was reported in April 2015 to have struck ice some time in 2014 while tracking Russian vessels.

Although originally scheduled for decommissioning in 2021, the slow delivery of the Astute-class boats was to have seen Talent retained in service for at least an additional 12 months, with her planned out of service date extended to the end of 2022.

References

External links

Royal Navy HMS Talent (royalnavy.mod.uk)

 

Trafalgar-class submarines
Ships built in Barrow-in-Furness
1988 ships
Cold War submarines of the United Kingdom
Submarines of the United Kingdom